Cho Bae-sook (Korean: 조배숙; born 10 September 1956) is a South Korean politician and legislator, serving as the Chairwoman of the liberal Party for Democracy and Peace, a party that split from the People's Party following Ahn Cheol-soo’s decision to merge with the Bareun Party to form the Bareunmirae Party. Cho is one of three woman leading prominent South Korean liberal parties, along with Choo Mi-ae of the Minjoo Party and Lee Jeong-mi of the Justice Party.

Biography
Cho studied at Seoul National University and received a Bachelor's and master's degree in law. She worked as a prosecutor and eventually served as a Judge in the Seoul District Court of Civil Affairs, and the Seoul Appellate Court. Cho was also elected to the National Assembly.

References

1956 births
Living people
People from Iksan
Seoul National University alumni
21st-century South Korean women politicians
21st-century South Korean politicians